Maree Todd is a Scottish National Party (SNP) politician who has been the Member of the Scottish Parliament (MSP) for Caithness, Sutherland and Ross since May 2021.  She was previously an MSP for the Highlands and Islands from the election in May 2016. She has served as the Minister for Public Health, Women's Health and Sport since May 2021, having previously been the Minister for Children and Young People from 2017 to 2021.

Early life and education
She was educated at Ullapool primary school and high school. She went to Robert Gordon University in Aberdeen, graduating in 1994 with a Bachelor of Science degree in Pharmacy.

Pharmacy career
She previously worked as a hospital pharmacist for NHS Highland. Before being elected as a MSP, she was based at the New Craigs Psychiatric Hospital in Inverness.

Political career
She was encouraged into politics after campaigning during the Scottish independence referendum that took place in 2014. In October 2015 she was announced as the top candidate on the SNP's regional list for the Highlands and Islands.

Todd was appointed Minister for Childcare and Early Years by First Minister Nicola Sturgeon on 7 November 2017.

Todd is a Species Champion for the Flame shell, through a scheme run by Scottish Environment LINK.

At the May 2021 Scottish Parliament election, Todd was elected as the MSP for the Caithness, Sutherland and Ross constituency.  On 19 May 2021, she was appointed to the new government as Minister for Public Health, Women's Health and Sport.

References

External links 
 
 personal website

Year of birth missing (living people)
Place of birth missing (living people)
Living people
Ministers of the Scottish Government
Scottish National Party councillors
Scottish pharmacists
Scottish National Party MSPs
Members of the Scottish Parliament 2016–2021
Members of the Scottish Parliament 2021–2026
Female members of the Scottish Parliament
People from Ross and Cromarty
Women pharmacists